Peleg Arnold (1751–1820) was a lawyer, tavern-keeper, jurist, and statesman from Smithfield, Rhode Island (now North Smithfield). He represented Rhode Island as a delegate to the Continental Congress in the 1787–1788 session. He later served as the chief justice of the Rhode Island Supreme Court from June 1795 to June 1809, and from May 1810 to May 1812.

Personal life
Arnold was born on June 10, 1751 at Smithfield (now North Smithfield), the ninth of the fifteen children of Thomas Arnold. His mother was Patience Cook of Newport who was Thomas' third wife. After starting in the common schools, he graduated from Brown University in Providence. Like many of his generation he prospered in a number of careers at the same time, and combined these with a government service and civic efforts.

Arnold read law, was admitted to the bar and practiced at Smithfield. He opened and kept the Peleg Arnold Tavern, which still stands at 4 Woonsocket Hill Road in North Smithfield, Rhode Island.

Arnold built his home in Union Village, which is now part of North Smithfield. During the Revolutionary War he was the colonel of the 2nd regiment of the Providence County Militia.

When the need for additional troops led to the re-formation of the 1st Rhode Island regiment of the Continental Line in 1778, Arnold was one of the proponents for the idea of using a bounty and freedom to encourage the enlistment of blacks. He continued this interest after the war when in 1790 he founded the Providence Society for the Abolition of Slavery.

Arnold's concern for his community is also evidenced by the creation of  the Smithfield Union Bank in 1803. He was the bank's first President, and it first conducted business from his home in Union. beginning in 1810, he served as president of a local preparatory school, the Smithfield Academy. Arnold died at Smithfield on February 13, 1820, and is buried in the Union Cemetery in today's North Smithfield.  According to one source, "[t]owards the close of his life Judge Peleg was widely known, not only as an extensive dealer in, but an ardent lover of, New England Rum."

Political career
Arnold was first elected to Rhode Island's governing body, the General Assembly in 1777. He would serve again from May 1782 to 1783. He was appointed as a Rhode Island delegate to the Confederation Congress in 1787. A strong supporter of the 1787 Constitutional Convention, in 1788 he left the congress to return home and address the ratification of the United States Constitution. He served briefly as Deputy Governor of Rhode Island in 1790.

Arnold made two unsuccessful attempts to win a seat in the United States House of Representatives. In the election of 1794, he ran against the incumbent Benjamin Bourne as an Anti-Federalist (Country Party) candidate. When Bourne resigned in 1796, he ran in the special election to finish the incomplete term, this time as a member of the Republican Party, and lost to Elisha Reynolds Potter.

In 1795 Arnold was named the chief justice of Rhode Island's Superior Court of Judicature, Court of Assize and General Gaol Delivery. The name of this court was changed in 1798 to the simpler "The Supreme Judicial Court". The Assembly re-appointed him annually every year until June 1809. After a year off due to illness, they appointed him again from 1810 to 1812. Arnold served again in the General Assembly from 1817 to 1819.

See also

Peleg Arnold House

References

External links

|-

1751 births
1820 deaths
Brown University alumni
Continental Congressmen from Rhode Island
18th-century American politicians
Rhode Island militiamen in the American Revolution
Chief Justices of the Rhode Island Supreme Court
People from North Smithfield, Rhode Island
Country Party (Rhode Island) politicians
Rhode Island Democratic-Republicans
Burials in Rhode Island
People of colonial Rhode Island
U.S. state supreme court judges admitted to the practice of law by reading law